Raymond K. McCoy (born 22 March 1964) is a Northern Irish former footballer who played at both semi-professional and international levels as a winger.

Career

Club career
Born in Cookstown, McCoy played youth-football with Cookstown United, before playing senior football with Coleraine, Gisborne City, Glenavon, Dundalk and Bangor.

International career
McCoy made one appearance for the Northern Ireland senior team in 1987.

References

1964 births
Living people
Association footballers from Northern Ireland
NIFL Premiership players
Northern Ireland international footballers
Coleraine F.C. players
Glenavon F.C. players
Dundalk F.C. players
Bangor F.C. players
Association football wingers